The Beijing Capital Airport Shuttle Bus (北京首都机场巴士) is an express public bus service mainly between the Beijing Capital International Airport (Capital Airport) and points within the city of Beijing and the surrounding region.  As of November 2019, there were 18 airport shuttle bus routes from the Capital Airport and the city proper, and six routes to Tianjin and Hebei Province.  In addition, the Beijing Airport Shuttle Bus also runs one route from Xidan in the city to the Beijing Nanyuan Airport.  One way fare on routes to the city costs between ¥20 to ¥30 and ¥40 to ¥140 on routes to Tianjin and cities in Hebei.

Tickets and information

Ticket counter locations:
Terminal 1: Inside Gate No. 7 on F1
Terminal 2: Outside Gates 9, 10 and 11 on F1
Terminal 3: in Exit Zone A, opposite Exit Zone C on F2 and next to Gate 5, 7 and 11 on F1. 
Telephone Inquiry:
General airport hotline: +86-10 96158
Bus lines to city: +86-10-64573891 / 64594376 / 64594375
Bus lines to other cities: +86-10-64558718

Routes

Capital Airport – City Routes

Nanyuan Airport– City Route

Capital Airport to other cities

See also
Capital Airport Express
Beijing Bus

References

External links

 Airport Shuttle information on the Beijing Capital International Airport website
 Official website of the Beijing Airport Shuttle Bus
 Lines of the Beijing Airport Shuttle Bus

Bus transport in China